Old Carlisle is a village in the civil parish of Westward in the Allerdale district of Cumbria, England. It is located by the River Waver, and was originally a part of Cumberland before the reorganisation of local government in 1974.

Roman Fort
During the Roman Times, Old Carlisle was home to a Roman Fort. It has been dated back to the 2nd century AD, and was destroyed and rebuilt in 296 AD.

References

External links

Villages in Cumbria
Allerdale